The 3rd Asian Winter Games were held from February 4 to 11, 1996 in Harbin, Heilongjiang, China. North Korea's Samjiyon was the original host for the games scheduled in 1995, but withdrew in August 1992. After the withdrawal, South Korea and then China submitted bids respectively. The Olympic Council of Asia (OCA) decided to elect the host cities for these 3rd games and the next 4th games simultaneously. On December 2, 1993, The OCA announced that the 3rd games would be held in China in 1996 and the 4th games would be held in South Korea in 1999.

Mascot

The 1996 Winter Asiad mascot is Doudou, a character inspired by the pea plant.

Sports
A total of 43 events in eight medal sports were held in the Third Winter Asian Games. Figure skating was reinstated and Freestyle skiing was added to the program.

 
 
 
 
 
 
 
 

Demonstration sport only:

Participating nations
Names are arranged in alphabetical order.

Non-competing nations

Medal table

References
 

 
A
Asian
Asian Winter Games
Asian Winter Games, 1996
A
Multi-sport events in China
February 1996 sports events in Asia